Phil Dwyain Glover (born December 17, 1975) is a former American football linebacker. He was drafted by the Tennessee Titans in the seventh round of the 1999 NFL Draft.

High school years
Glover attended Clark High School in Las Vegas, Nevada, and was a student and a letterman in football and wrestling. In football, he was a two-time All-Conference selection and a two-time All-State selection, and as a senior, he led his team to a Nevada state title and was named the Nevada Player of the Year. In wrestling, he was a four-year letterman and as a senior, he won a state championship in the 171-pound division.

College career
Glover played college football at Washington State University and the University of Utah.

Professional career

National Football League (NFL)
Glover was selected in the seventh round (222nd overall) of the 1999 NFL Draft. He spent 1999 with the Tennessee Titans. He was then allocated to the Scottish Claymores of NFL Europe in 2000 and then spent time with the Indianapolis Colts.

Arena Football League (AFL)
Glover was out of football in 2001, however he signed with the Toronto Phantoms of the Arena Football League in 2002. He then was out of football again in 2003, and then signed with the Las Vegas Gladiators in 2004. He spent part of the season with Las Vegas, he then spent the rest of the season and the 2005 season with the Arizona Rattlers. He played for the San Jose SaberCats for two and a half seasons from 2006 to midway through 2008 when he was traded to the Tampa Bay Storm.

Notes

External links
 Profile at NFL.com
 Stats at ArenaFan

1975 births
Living people
American football linebackers
Washington State Cougars football players
Utah Utes football players
Tennessee Titans players
Scottish Claymores players
Indianapolis Colts players
Toronto Phantoms players
Las Vegas Gladiators players
Arizona Rattlers players
San Jose SaberCats players
Tampa Bay Storm players
Sportspeople from Las Vegas
Players of American football from Nevada